Khan "Bob" Malaythong (born 10 April 1981 in Vientiane, Laos) is an American badminton player. He qualified for the U.S. badminton team as a doubles competitor at the 2008 Summer Olympics.

Malaythong moved to the United States at age 8. Malaythong teamed with Howard Bach in men's doubles. Malaythong graduated from William Jefferson Palmer High School in Colorado Springs, Colorado and Santa Ana College.

Malaythong portrayed a Chinese badminton player in a Vitamin Water commercial starring David Ortiz and Brian Urlacher.

Bob Malaythong won the U.S. National Badminton Championships six times in the men's doubles event in 2003 with Tony Gunawan and in 2005, 2006, 2007, 2008 & 2009 with partner Howard Bach. He also won one mixed doubles National title with Mesinee Mangkalakiri in 2005.
Malaythong now currently coaches at the Synergy Badminton Academy in Menlo Park, CA, along with fellow Olympian and long-time friend, Raju Rai.

Achievements

Pan American Games 
Men's doubles

Mixed doubles

Pan Am Championships 
Men's doubles

Mixed doubles

BWF Grand Prix 
The BWF Grand Prix has two level such as Grand Prix and Grand Prix Gold. It is a series of badminton tournaments, sanctioned by Badminton World Federation (BWF) since 2007. The World Badminton Grand Prix sanctioned by International Badminton Federation (IBF) since 1983.

Men's doubles

 BWF Grand Prix Gold tournament
 BWF & IBF Grand Prix tournament

BWF International Challenge/Series 
Men's singles

Men's doubles

Mixed doubles

 BWF International Challenge tournament
 BWF International Series tournament
 BWF Future Series tournament

References

External links 
 
 Malaythong's Blog

Living people
1981 births
People from Vientiane
Laotian emigrants to the United States
American male badminton players
Badminton players at the 2008 Summer Olympics
Olympic badminton players of the United States
Badminton players at the 2007 Pan American Games
Pan American Games silver medalists for the United States
Pan American Games bronze medalists for the United States
Pan American Games medalists in badminton
Medalists at the 2007 Pan American Games